Sven Axel Tankred Eklund (1916–1997) was a Swedish curler and sports executive. He was the alternate on the team that represented Sweden during the 1963 Scotch Cup, the World Men's Curling Championship at the time. He was also a former president of the World Curling Federation and is a WCF Hall of Fame inductee.

Eklund curled out of the Åredalens Curlingklubb in Åre, Sweden with teammates John-Allan Månsson, Curt Jonsson, Gustav Larsson, and Magnus Berge when he represented Sweden at the 1963 Scotch Cup. He later became the captain of the Swedish national curling team, and he also became president of the International Curling Association, now known as the World Curling Federation. He was also active in the curling club Fjällgårdens CK.

At the national level, he was a four-time Swedish men's champion curler (1952, 1954, 1955, 1959), played at third position.

In 1966 he was awarded with the Svenska Curlingförbundets Guldmedalj by the Swedish Curling Association. In 1966 he was inducted into the Swedish Curling Hall of Fame. In 1982 he was awarded with the Elmer Freytag Award from the World Curling Federation.

In 1968 Eklund produced the Swedish curling manual Curling.

Teams

Personal life
Eklund was the father of actress Britt Ekland.

References

External links
 

Swedish male curlers
Swedish curling champions
1916 births
1997 deaths
Sportspeople from Stockholm
Swedish sports executives and administrators